Nicola Crawford (born 20 November 1971) is a former English female rugby union player. She represented  at the 2006 Women's Rugby World Cup. Crawford retired from international rugby after 63 appearances and the 2006 World Cup.

References

1971 births
Living people
England women's international rugby union players
English female rugby union players
Female rugby union players